27 Canis Majoris is a binary star system in the northern constellation of Canis Major, located approximately 1,700 light years away from the Sun. It has the variable star designation EW Canis Majoris; 27 Canis Majoris is the Flamsteed designation. This system is visible to the naked eye as a dim, blue-white hued star with an apparent visual magnitude of +4.65. It is moving away from the Earth with a heliocentric radial velocity of 16 km/s.

The pair of stars in this system were first resolved by W. S. Finsen in 1953, and the split has been widening since that time. The magnitude 4.92 primary, designated component A, is a Be star with a stellar classification of B3 IIIpe. It is spinning rapidly with a projected rotational velocity of 290 km/s, compared to a critical velocity of 389 km/s. The star appears to be a Beta Cephei variable with a pulsation period of 0.0919 days and an amplitude of 0.0080 in magnitude.

The magnitude 5.39 secondary, component B, is classified as a Gamma Cassiopeiae type variable star. Due to its variable nature, the brightness of the system varies from magnitude +4.42 to +4.82.

References

B-type giants
Be stars
Gamma Cassiopeiae variable stars
Binary stars
Canis Major
Durchmusterung objects
Canis Majoris, 27
056014
034981
2745
Canis Majoris, EW